Lee Jung Hyun II is Lee Jung Hyun's untitled second album, it was released on June 1, 2000. It is sometimes called "Peace", "Lee Jung Hyun 2nd", or "You" since its official title was never revealed.

Track listing
"Intro"-Message I
"평화" (Pyeonghwa / Peace)
"Feel Me!"
"너" (Nuh / You)
"줄래" (Joolae / Give To You)
"따" (Tta / Pick)
"꿈" (Kkum / Dreams)
"잘먹고 잘살아라..." (Jal muk go jal sa ra la... / Eat Well, Live Well...)
"아냐" (Anya / No)
"끝났어" (Kkeutnasso / It's Over)
"도전" (Dojeon / Challenge)
"피어" (Pieo / Come Out)
"Love Is A Secret"
"너" (Nuh / You) Techno Version
"Outro"-Message II

2000 albums
Lee Jung-hyun albums